The Great Northern Railway Underpass at Stanley, North Dakota is a concrete deck girder bridge that was built in 1937. It is listed on the National Register of Historic Places.

According to its nomination, the bridge "is a heavily-built single-span steel stringer design with a concrete substructure. This design saw common use in the numerous structures built to carry North Dakota roadways under railroad lines, generally beginning in the 1930s."

References

Road bridges on the National Register of Historic Places in North Dakota
Bridges completed in 1937
National Register of Historic Places in Mountrail County, North Dakota
Steel bridges in the United States
Girder bridges in the United States
Concrete bridges in the United States
Great Northern Railway (U.S.) bridges
1937 establishments in North Dakota
Transportation in Mountrail County, North Dakota